Rocco Pecoraro (born 6 January 1970) is an Italian rower. He competed in the men's coxless four event at the 1992 Summer Olympics.

References

External links
 

1970 births
Living people
Italian male rowers
Olympic rowers of Italy
Rowers at the 1992 Summer Olympics
Sportspeople from the Province of Salerno